Paul Youll (born 1965 in Hartlepool, England) is a science fiction and fantasy artist and illustrator. He was born as one of five sons and, at one time, was part of a two-man illustration team with his twin brother, Stephen. He got his start in the genre when his work, done in conjunction with Stephen's, was seen in 1987 at the 45th World Science Fiction Convention in Brighton, England.  His first commission, a collaboration with Stephen, was for the cover painting for Emerald Eyes by Daniel Keys Moran that was published by Bantam Books.

After graduating from the Durham New College of Art and Design, Paul spent two more years at Sunderland University.  Since 1989, when Stephen moved to America, Paul has worked independently and has produced paintings mainly for Bantam Books.  Youll currently resides with his wife Annmarie in the country village of Esh Winning, on the border of Derwent Side and County Durham.  He illustrates primarily for the U.S. softcover (paperback) book market.

Works
This list is incomplete

 Star Wars: X-wing
 Rogue Squadron (1995)
 Wedge's Gamble (1995)
 The Krytos Trap (1996)
 The Bacta War (1996)
 Wraith Squadron (1997)
 Iron Fist (1997)
 Solo Command (1997)
 Isard's Revenge (1998)
 Starfighters of Adumar (1999)
 Tales From the New Republic (1998)
 The Icarus Hunt (1999) by Timothy Zahn
 Dr. Zeus Inc. series by Kage Baker
 The Life of the World to Come (2004)
 The Children of the Company (2005)
 Gods and Pawns (2007)
 The Merchant Princes series by Charles Stross
 The Family Trade (2004)
 The Hidden Family (2005)
 The Clan Corporate (2006)
 The Merchants' War (2007)
 The Revolution Business (2009)
 The Trade of Queens (2010)
 The Age of Fire series by E. E. Knight
 Dragon Champion (2005)
 Dragon Avenger (2006)
 Dragon Outcast (2007)
 Dragon Strike (2008)
 Excession by Ian M. Banks (1998)
 The Mirrored Heavens by David J. Williams (2008)

Joint works
These works were done in collaboration with his brother, Stephen.

This list is incomplete

 Emerald Eyes (1988) by Daniel Keys Moran
 On My Way to Paradise (1989) by Dave Wolverton
 Infinity Hold by Barry B. Longyear
 Shaping the Dawn by Sheila Finch
 To the Land of the Living by Robert Silverberg
 The Atheling by Grace Chetwin
 A Fire in the Sun by George Alec Effinger
 The Exile Kiss by George Alec Effinger
 Lord of Snow and Shadows by Sarah Ash
 The Garden of the Shaped by Sheila Finch
 A Feast for Crows by George R.R. Martin
 Mistress of Dragons by Margaret Weis
 Beauty by Sheri S. Tepper
 The Gates of Winter by Mark Anthony
 Fool's Errand by Robin Hobb
 Golden Fool by Robin Hobb
 Hung Out by Margaret Weis and Don Perrin
 A Forest of Stars by Kevin J. Anderson
 Hidden Empire by Kevin J. Anderson
 Defender by C. J. Cherryh 
 Gojiro by John Barnes
 The Wellstone by Wil Mccarthy
 The Collasium by Wil Mccarthy
 The Green Brain by Frank Herbert
 The Eyes of Heisenberg by Frank Herbert

References

External links

1965 births
Alumni of the University of Sunderland
Fantasy artists
British speculative fiction artists
Living people
People from Hartlepool
Science fiction artists
English twins
People from Esh Winning